Paul André Boutilier (born May 3, 1963) is a Canadian former professional ice hockey defenceman who played with several National Hockey League teams in the 1980s. He was a member of the 1983 Stanley Cup champion New York Islanders.

Playing career
Boutilier was born in Sydney, Nova Scotia. He starred in the QMJHL with the Sherbrooke Castors in the early 1980s. In 1982, he helped the team reach the Memorial Cup finals, however his team lost to the Kitchener Rangers. He was named to the tournament all-star team, and was voted a first team all-star by the QMJHL. Chosen 21st overall by the New York Islanders in the 1981 NHL Entry Draft (ahead of such future NHL stars as Chris Chelios and John Vanbiesbrouck), Boutilier split his first full pro season between the Islanders and the CHL's Indianapolis Checkers. He did, however, have his name inscribed on the Stanley Cup in 1983 after appearing in two playoff games for the champion Isles. He also attended McGill University during off-seasons.

Boutilier became a regular on the Islanders' blueline in 1984–85 and recorded a career-best 35 points. He scored 34 points the next year and showed a willingness to play rough in his own zone. Over the next four years his play was less consistent. He moved around the league with the Boston Bruins, Minnesota North Stars, New York Rangers, Winnipeg Jets, and three different minor pro clubs. He retired in 1990 after spending most of the year in Switzerland with SC Bern.

Coaching
Boutilier was named St. Mary's (AUAA) assistant coach prior to the 1991–92 season and remained in that position through 1992–93. He was promoted to head coach prior to 1993–94 season and remained in that position through 1996–97.

Post-hockey
After retiring from hockey, Boutilier became a regular on the Canadian curling circuit, serving as head of the World Curling Tour and World Curling Players' Association.

He currently teaches International Marketing at the University of Prince Edward Island and is the Director of Defence Development & Analytics for the Saint John Sea Dogs in the QMJHL. In 2015, he was named assistant coach of the Sea Dogs.

Career statistics

Regular season and playoffs

International

Awards & honors
 QMJHL First All-Star Team (1982)
 QMJHL Emile Bouchard Trophy (Defenseman of Year) 1981-82
 Memorial Cup Tournament All-Star Team (1982)
1983 Stanley Cup- New York Islanders
 AHL First All-Star Team (1989)
 Inducted to Nova Scotia Sports Hall of Fame, 1994

External links
Hockey Draft Central

References

1963 births
Living people
Athabasca University alumni
Boston Bruins players
Canadian ice hockey defencemen
Canadian people of Acadian descent
Colorado Rangers players
Indianapolis Checkers (CHL) players
Sportspeople from the Cape Breton Regional Municipality
Maine Mariners players
Minnesota North Stars players
Moncton Hawks players
National Hockey League first-round draft picks
New Haven Nighthawks players
New York Islanders draft picks
New York Islanders players
New York Rangers players
People from Sydney, Nova Scotia
Saint-Jean Castors players
SC Bern players
Sherbrooke Castors players
Stanley Cup champions
Winnipeg Jets (1979–1996) players
Ice hockey people from Nova Scotia
Academic staff of the University of Prince Edward Island
ZSC Lions players
Canadian expatriate ice hockey players in Switzerland